Lokovica is a settlement in the Municipality of Prevalje in the Carinthia region in northern Slovenia, close to the border with Austria.

References

External links
Lokovica on Geopedia

Populated places in the Municipality of Prevalje